Scope is an album by saxophonist Buck Hill which was recorded in 1979 and released on the SteepleChase label.

Reception

The AllMusic review by Scott Yanow stated "The tunes are mostly challenging, not being based on bop standards, and clearly inspired the musicians. Hill is heard in top form throughout the underrated but superior session".

Track listing
All compositions by Buck Hill except where noted
 "Scope" – 5:54
 "Ballad Repeter" – 6:14
 "Little Bossa" – 7:19
 "Beast Beautiful" – 5:37
 "The Sad Ones" – 8:13
 "Funk Dumplin" – 5:56
 "Snaps" (Buster Williams) – 7:26 Additional track on CD release

Personnel
Buck Hill – tenor saxophone
Kenny Barron – piano 
Buster Williams – bass 
Billy Hart – drums

References

SteepleChase Records albums
Buck Hill (musician) albums
1979 albums